Eski Saray (Turkish for "Old Palace"), also known as Sarây-ı Atîk-i Âmire, was a palatial building in Constantinople during the period of Ottoman rule, and it was the first such palace built in the city following the conquest of 1453. It was located in the Beyazıt neighborhood of the Fatih district, in an area now housing the main campus of Istanbul University, between the Süleymaniye Mosque and the Bayezid II Mosque.

Construction of the palace commenced shortly after the 1453 conquest, and it was completed in 1458. Although historians of the period such as Doukas and Michael Critobulus stated that it was completed in 1455, the general opinion is that by then various parts such as the harem and mansion were finished, but it was not fully completed until 1458.

Historian Tursun Beg, a contemporary of Mehmed II, mentioned that the palace housed mansions, a harem, the Imperial Council, the throne room where the Sultan carried out state affairs, and its grounds included an area for hunting.

Later on in his reign, Mehmed II began to build the Topkapı Palace, and when the palace was completed in 1478 he settled there. Although the Sultan lived in the Topkapı Palace, he continued to visit the harem at the Eski Saray on some days of the week. In subsequent years, the palace and its grounds went through numerous changes. In the early 1500s, Sultan Bayezid II built the Bayezid II Mosque partially on the grounds of the palace. Matrakçı Nasuh depicted the palace in miniature, with two walls and residential buildings along the inner wall. In 1540–1541, the Eski Saray was largely destroyed by fire before being rebuilt by Kanuni. After the fire, who destroyed the harem of the palace, the harem of Suleiman was permanently moved into the Topkapı Palace ("New Palace"), from this moment on, the imperial harem of Ottoman sultans would remain permanently in Topkapi palace. The mother of deceased sultans were sent to the Eski Saray at the request of current mother sultan, disgraced concubines, women of former Sultans or şehzade accused of treason (such as Şehzade Süleyman) continued to be sent or exiled in the Eski Saray's harem. When the complex of the Süleymaniye Mosque was constructed in 1557, it once again took up part of the Eski Saray's area. 

In the years 1625-1632 during the reign of Murad IV the palace was restored, but in 1687, a large fire broke out near the palace. By the next evening the fire had engulfed the Eski Saray. The fire burned for five hours and many places of the palace burned down. Most of lives of people in the palace were saved by aghas and other servants of the palace, but Muazzez Sultan was affected from the fire and she died the next day.

Today, no remains of the palace have survived.

References 

Buildings of Mehmed the Conqueror
Buildings and structures in Istanbul
Demolished buildings and structures in Istanbul
Fatih
Government of the Ottoman Empire
Houses completed in the 15th century
Ottoman court
Ottoman palaces in Istanbul